Begonia aconitifolia is a species of plant in the family Begoniaceae, endemic to Brazil. It grows up to 1 meter in height, with panicles of pink flowers.

Synonyms
 Begonia faureana Garnier
 Begonia faureana var. argentea Linden
 Begonia faureana var. metallica Rodigas
 Begonia kimusiana C.Chev.
 Begonia sceptrum Rodigas

References

 Ann. Sci. Nat., Bot. IV, 11: 127 1859.
 The Plant List
 Hortipedia
 The Garden Geeks

Flora of Brazil
aconitifolia